Friedhelm Haebermann (born 24 July 1946 in Duisburg) is a former German football player and manager.

Haebermann made a total of 229 appearances for Eintracht Braunschweig in the Bundesliga during his playing career. He also represented West Germany at the 1972 Summer Olympics.

References

External links 
 

1946 births
Living people
Footballers from Duisburg
German footballers
Olympic footballers of West Germany
West German footballers
Footballers at the 1972 Summer Olympics
Bundesliga players
Association football sweepers
Eintracht Braunschweig players
German football managers
Tennis Borussia Berlin managers